This is a list of the governors of the province of Ghor, Afghanistan.

Governors of Ghor Province

See also
 List of current governors of Afghanistan

References

Ghor